Glyn Riley (born 24 July 1958) is an English former professional footballer who played as a striker.

Career
Born in Barnsley, Riley played for Barnsley, Doncaster Rovers, Bristol City, Torquay United, Aldershot and Bath City.
Riley's effervescent playing style made him a popular figure amongst fans. His cult status was cemented in 1986 when Bristol City played at Wembley for the first time in their history. Riley scored two goals as Bristol City beat Bolton Wanderers 3–0 in the Football League Trophy final.

References

1958 births
Living people
English footballers
Barnsley F.C. players
Doncaster Rovers F.C. players
Bristol City F.C. players
Torquay United F.C. players
Aldershot F.C. players
Bath City F.C. players
English Football League players
Association football forwards